Nazar Bolot uulu (Назар Болот уулу) (d. 1893) was a Kyrgyz oral poet.

Later folkloric sources and oral history records him as the unnamed performer of the first known transcription of an episode from the Epic of Manas, collected in 1856 by Shoqan Walikhanov in San-Tas.

While Walikhanov's general comments about the epos were published and widely disseminated, the actual transcription was misplaced, only to be rediscovered by Alkey Margulan in the Leningrad Academy of Sciences in 1964. The manuscript was later edited by A. T. Hatto.

References

1893 deaths
Manaschis